Bhrugu Baxipatra is an 46-year-old active politician from India. He is a member of the Bharatiya Janata Party (BJP) and represents the Jeypore constituency of Odisha. He is the son of Late Harish Chandra Baxipatra, ex-MLA of Koraput constituency of Orissa and an ex-minister from the state government. Bhrugu is now the Vice President  of Odisha BJP.

Early life 
Baxipatra is the son of Late Harish Chandra Baxipatra, a former India politician representing the state of Orissa. Bhrugu Baxipatra completed his BA degree from Berhampur University in year-1997-1998, and went on to obtain an LLB from Utkal University in 1999-2000.

Public Causes 
Bhrugu Baxipatra is a well-known face among the politicians of India. He represents the Berhampur constituency of Odisha and is a member of the Bharatiya Janata Party(BJP). His concern for his own birthplace is what pushes him to work harder each day towards its development. He could figure out from the very start of his political career that on what grounds Berhampur is still to get better. Problems like women empowerment, proper sanitation, basic health care, poor infrastructure, backward education system, pollution and above all poverty are acting as hindrances towards the development of The Silk City.

He has until now proved to be successful in eradicating the most widely spread endemic, i.e. corruption and violence under his constituency, maintaining peace and harmony throughout. There is no telling how much problems has he faced in doing so.

He is one alarmed politician among all in his party. He's aware that only providing basic education to children won't solve the problem of illiteracy because as many adults are also untouched by education and remain jobless.

Bhrugu Baxipatra since time immemorial has promoted peace and safety of the people not only under his constituency but for the people of Odisha. He and his activists are there to lead the crowd and enlighten the society everytime. Bhrugu Bhai hopes to be successful in getting good response from the people of Berhampur this time.

References

External links
 Official Website

People from Odisha
Living people
1976 births
Bharatiya Janata Party politicians from Odisha